"Suffer Never" is a song by Tim Finn and Neil Finn during their partnership as Finn. It was first released in 1995 on their debut album Finn. It reached #29 on the UK Singles Chart, and #70 in Australia.  Lead vocals for the song were performed by Neil.

Charts

References

1995 singles
Song recordings produced by Tchad Blake
1995 songs
Songs written by Neil Finn
Songs written by Tim Finn